White Death, subtitled "Velikiye Luki, The Stalingrad of the North", is a board wargame published by Game Designers Workshop (GDW) in 1979 that is a strategic simulation of the Battle of Velikiye Luki during World War II.

Background
The German summer offensive of 1942 had forced the Soviets back along a broad front. In the fall of 1942, the Soviets sprung a massive counterattack. One part of that offensive was an encirclement of the German-held city of Velikiye Luki by the Third Shock Army under General Maksim Purkayev. The Germans responded by trying to break the siege to rescue the defenders.

Description
White Death is a two-player wargame where one player controls the Soviet forces besieging Velikiye Luki, and the other player controls the German defenders and relief columns.

Components
The original GDW edition game box contains:
22" x 28" paper hex grid map scaled at 1 mi (1.6 km) per hex
rulebook
480 double-sided die-cut counters
various player aids
6-sided die

The version published by Command Japan has 550 counters and does not include a die.

Gameplay
Each game turn represents five days and is divided into first a Soviet turn and then a German turn. Both players start each turn with ten movement points. Each turn is broken down into "impulses", which are further subdivided into five phases: 
 Movement Phase
 Barrage Phase
Defensive Fire Phase
Assault Phase
Terminal Phase
During each impulse, the active player can choose "action" or "pass". If choosing "pass", the player can only attack with barrage, and can only move by railway. If "action" is chosen, then the player spends between 1 and 10 movement points to move one or more units, and then can use both barrage fire and assault. The active player's impulses continue until all ten movement points have been used. The other player then becomes the active player.

Scenarios
The game has six scenarios:
"Purkayev’s Attack" (4 turns)
"Woehler’s Response" (3 turns)
"First Relief Attempt"(2 turns)
"Second Relief Attempt" 2 turns)
"Final Relief Attempt" (2 turns)
"Velikiye Luki Campaign": A compilation of all five of the shorter scenarios in a 13-turn game

Victory conditions
The victory conditions for each scenario are based on enemy units destroyed, as well as reaching geographical objectives.

Publication history
Historian Shelby Stanton researched the Battle of Velikiye Luki and passed that on to friend and game designer Frank Chadwick, who turned Stanton's research into the wargame White Death, published by GDW in as a boxed set in 1979 with cover art by Rodger B. MacGowan. 

In 1990, the software firm Command Simulations acquired the license to develop a computer game version of White Death for DOS and Amiga.

Command Japan magazine (シミュレーションゲーム コマンドマガジン) published a Japanese-language pull-out version of the game (ホワイト・デス) in Issue 96 (January–February 2011).

Reception
In Issue 26 of Phoenix, Geoff Barnard called White Death "a superb example of a historically accurate wargame in which it is clear, almost from the very moment that you open the package, that the historicty of the simulation weas one of the prime considerations." Barnard liked the "clean system" of rules that resulted in a "cleanly flowing game." He concluded with a strong recommendation, saying, "White Death is a game of small actions and much maneovre and even when the fronts do form later in the game it flows."

Other reviews and commentary
Fire & Movement No. 21
Paper Wars No. 6
Casus Belli (Issue 14 - Apr 1983)
Moves #50, p28

References

Board wargames with artwork by Rodger B. MacGowan
Frank Chadwick games
Game Designers' Workshop games
Wargames introduced in 1979
World War II board wargames